Harpagoxenus is a genus of ants in the subfamily Myrmicinae. Found in the Palaearctic and Nearctic ecozones of the world, Harpagoxenus was first established as Tomognathus by Mayr (1861) to house the species Myrmica sublaevis (now Harpagoxenus sublaevis). However, the name had already been used (homonym) for a genus of fish, and was replaced with its current name by Forel (1893).

Species
 Harpagoxenus canadensis Smith, 1939
 Harpagoxenus sublaevis (Nylander, 1849)
 Harpagoxenus zaisanicus Pisarski, 1963

References

External links

Myrmicinae
Ant genera
Taxa named by Auguste Forel
Taxonomy articles created by Polbot